Saba University School of Medicine is a private for-profit offshore medical school located on Saba, a special municipality of the Netherlands in the Caribbean. Saba University confers upon its graduates the Doctor of Medicine (MD) degree. It is owned by R3 Education, Inc. which also owns St. Matthew's University and the Medical University of the Americas

History
Saba University School of Medicine was founded in 1992 as an international alternative to U.S. and Canadian medical schools. Since its founding, more than 2500 students have earned their medical degree at Saba.

In 2006, the people of Saba, Sint Eustatius and Bonaire agreed to dissolve the Netherlands Antilles. Upon the imminent dissolution of the country, the ministers of health of the Netherlands and the Netherlands Antilles requested Accreditation Organisation of the Netherlands and Flanders (NVAO) to assess the quality of all medical schools in the Netherlands Antilles. Saba University was the only medical school in the Netherlands Antilles that earned accreditation, and thus was the only medical school to be allowed to stay in those islands.

Curriculum

Basic sciences curriculum

 
The first five basic science semesters of Saba's curriculum follow an outline comparable to those of American medical schools. These semesters consist of lab work and course material following a progression beginning with foundational concepts in the basic and clinical sciences and leading to organ-systems-focused courses that relate each foundational discipline to human function and disease. Applications of basic science to clinical medicine are highlighted throughout the five semesters. All classes are taught in English.

"Research: Literature Review and Analysis" module
In the fifth semester of the Saba University curriculum, students complete a "Research: Literature Review and Analysis" module, designed to further develop the ability to evaluate and assimilate scientific evidence and reinforce the skills for critically appraising and communicating medical knowledge.

Students analyze a current and complex medical care question, develop a hypothesis, analyze the literature, and write a paper that is evaluated by a faculty committee. According to the school's website, Saba students have had their papers published in medical journals and have also reported that their research played a role in obtaining a residency appointment.

Clinical curriculum
The clinical education at Saba University School of Medicine takes place primarily in the second half of the academic program, semesters 6 to 10—the final semesters before earning the medical degree and entering a residency program. The clinical program consists of:
 42 weeks of required core rotations in Surgery, Internal Medicine, Pediatrics, Psychiatry, and Obstetrics and Gynecology.
 30 weeks of elective clinical rotations that the student may select based on their projected medical specialty.
During the clinical semesters, students go through a series of rotations (or clerkships) in teaching hospitals in the U.S. and Canada, while also absorbing new material through work that is assigned and supervised by the Saba clinical department.

Academic outcomes

According to the US Department of Education, 75% of students completed the program on time in 2019.

Pass rates of students and graduates on United States Medical Licensing Examinations (USMLE) in calendar year 2019 were as follows: 

 
Step 1 – Basic Science 98.05%  
Step 2 – Clinical Knowledge 100%  
Step 3 – Clinical Skills 89.2%

As of at least 2021, Saba graduates demonstrate Step 1 and Step 2 of their Clinical Knowledge scores portions of the USMLE that are on par to the pass rates among the 110 ranked medical schools in the U.S. News Best Medical Schools rankings that reported their USMLE pass rates: 
 
Step 1 – Basic Science 96.3%  
 
Step 2 – Clinical Knowledge 96.6%

Accreditation and licensure
Saba University School of Medicine has received the accreditation and approvals that enable Saba graduates, who complete the requisite licensing examinations, to become eligible to practice medicine in all 50 states in the U.S., Canada and Puerto Rico.

Saba University has been approved by the following U.S. states which have a separate review process for the purposes of licensing or providing clinical rotations:
Saba is approved by the Medical Board of California 
Saba is approved by the Florida Department of Education's Commission for the purpose of students participating in clinical rotations in that state.
Saba University School of Medicine is approved by the New York State Education Department (NYSED) to allow students to complete more than 12 weeks of clinical clerkships in New York State. Saba is one of eight Caribbean medical schools so approved by NYSED.
Saba is approved by the Kansas State Board of Healing Arts (KSBHA). 
Saba University School of Medicine is approved by the United States Department of Education for participation in the William D. Ford Federal Direct Loan Program.  Qualified citizens and permanent residents of the United States are eligible to receive funding from the Direct Loan programs to help pay for the cost of their education.

Saba University School of Medicine is a legally recognized entity of higher education in the Netherlands and its program of medicine is accredited by the Accreditation Organisation of the Netherlands and Flanders (NVAO). While it is located in the Caribbean, accreditation by the NVAO makes the university the 9th medical school in the Kingdom of the Netherlands.

Student life

Class sizes are 80-100 students per matriculating class. Students complete the first 20 months (five semesters) of basic science medical education on the campus on Saba and return to the US and Canada to complete clinical rotations at hospitals affiliated with the school.

Numerous student organizations exist at Saba.

See also
 International medical graduate
 List of medical schools in the Caribbean

References

External links
 

Buildings and structures in The Bottom
Schools of medicine in Saba
1986 establishments in the Netherlands Antilles
Educational institutions established in 1986
The Bottom